The 1995 World Series was the championship series of Major League Baseball's (MLB) 1995 season. The 91st edition of the World Series, it was a best-of-seven playoff played between the National League (NL) champion Atlanta Braves and the American League (AL) champion Cleveland Indians. The Braves won in six games to capture their third World Series championship in franchise history (along with 1914 in Boston and 1957 in Milwaukee), making them the first team to win at least one crown in three different cities. This was also Cleveland's first Series appearance in 41 years and marked the resumption of the Fall Classic after the previous year's Series was canceled due to a players' strike.

The Series was also remarkable in that five of the six games were won by one run, including the clinching sixth game, a 1–0 combined one-hitter by Tom Glavine and Mark Wohlers.

This was the first time since the LCS changed to a best-of-seven format that a winner of a LCS via a sweep has gone on to win the World Series. It has since been repeated in 2019 by the Washington Nationals, and in 2022 by the Houston Astros.

This World Series, despite being in an odd-numbered year, opened in the NL home because of the omission of the 1994 World Series. Until 2003, the World Series would begin in the AL home in even-numbered years.

Background

Atlanta Braves

After losing the World Series in 1991 to the Minnesota Twins and in 1992 to the Toronto Blue Jays, the Atlanta Braves were making their third attempt in four years (not counting the 1994 strike) to capture Atlanta's first title.

The Braves overcame some early inconsistency to win their division by 21 games. In the playoffs, which featured a new first round, the Braves overwhelmed the third-year Colorado Rockies, then swept the Cincinnati Reds in the NLCS (spoiling an all-Ohio World Series in the process; notably, prior to their World Series appearance in 1948, the Indians had spoiled an all-Boston World Series by beating the Red Sox in a one-game playoff). The team relied on clutch hitting and its powerful pitching rotation, which was made up of perennial Cy Young Award winner Greg Maddux, Tom Glavine, John Smoltz, and Steve Avery.

As the NL champion, they opened this World Series at home because there was no 1994 World Series.

Cleveland Indians

After decades of futility, the city of Cleveland finally had a winner in town. The Indians dominated the American League in 1995, winning 100 of their 144 games (their 100–44 record yielded a very high 0.694 winning percentage, which was, at the time, the highest regular season winning percentage in Major League Baseball since 1954, and is, as of 2015, the 12th highest regular season winning percentage in Major League Baseball history since 1900).  Furthermore, in just 144 games, they won the AL Central by 30 games, and they performed the difficult feat of leading their league in both team batting average (0.291) and ERA (3.81).  Thanks to their hitting and bullpen, this Indians team became known around the league for their ability to come back from many deficits, often in dramatic fashion; of their 100 regular season victories, 48 were come-back victories, 27 came in their last at-bat, eight came by way of "walk off" home runs, and 13 were extra-inning victories (they were 13–0 in extra-inning games).  After this dominance of the AL in the regular season, the Indians, in the playoffs, swept the Boston Red Sox in the opening round, then held off Ken Griffey Jr. and the red hot Seattle Mariners in the ALCS, before heading into the Series against the Braves.

The 1995 Cleveland Indians featured a very impressive batting line-up; one that hit for high average, good power, and had good speed.  In addition to leading the AL in batting average (0.291), the Indians in 1995 also led the American League in runs scored (840; 5.83 runs per game), home runs (207), and stolen bases (132).  Led by speedsters Kenny Lofton and Omar Vizquel, along with Carlos Baerga at the top of the order, the Indians offense was powered in the middle of the order by Albert Belle, Eddie Murray, Manny Ramírez, and Jim Thome; at the bottom of the line-up could be found Paul Sorrento (or Herbert Perry) and Sandy Alomar Jr. (or Tony Peña). Thus, this Indians line-up had six everyday players who finished the season with a batting average of at least 0.300; and, with Herbert Perry and Tony Peña frequently filling in for Paul Sorrento and Sandy Alomar Jr., respectively, it was not uncommon for the Tribe to field a line-up with as many as eight players who finished the season with a batting average of at least 0.300.  In terms of power, though the '95 season was shortened, nevertheless, the Indians' line-up still featured two players with at least 30 HR, five players with at least 20 HR, and seven with at least 10 HR.  While this line-up was filled with star players (four, in fact, were named to the 1995 AL All-Star team, namely, Lofton, Baerga, Belle, and Ramirez), Albert Belle stood out among all of them in 1995.  Powered by a very strong second half of the season, Belle, the Indians' clean-up hitter in 1995, finished 1995 with a 0.317 batting average, 126 RBI, and 50 home runs.  Further to be noted is the fact that, in hitting 50 HR and 52 doubles in 1995, Belle became the first Major League player to hit at least 50 home runs and at least 50 doubles in the same season (an accomplishment which, again, is even more remarkable considering that he did this in a shortened, 144-game season).

The Indians also led the 1995 AL in ERA (3.81).  While their starting pitching—led by veterans Dennis Martínez and Orel Hershiser—was respectable, it was their bullpen which gave real strength to their pitching staff.  Key members of their bullpen staff included veteran right-hander Eric Plunk (6–2, 2.67 ERA), veteran left-hander Paul Assenmacher (6–2, 2.82), the young right-handed set-up man, Julián Tavárez (10–1, 2.44 ERA), and right-handed closer, José Mesa (3–0, 1.12 ERA, 46 SV).  Mesa, in his first year as closer, posted a league-leading 46 saves in 1995, and set a then-Major League record of 38 consecutive saves without a blown save.  Two of the members of the 1995 Indians' pitching staff—Dennis Martínez (the team's ace) and José Mesa—were named to the 1995 AL All-Star team.

Series build-up

Thus it was that this Series presented an entertaining match-up of baseball's two best teams, each with reasons to be confident going into the Series. The Atlanta Braves were veterans to the post-season in the 1990s, having won both the 1991 and 1992 NL pennants (not to mention the 1993 NL Western Division title, having won 104 games in 1993), and they were the best team in the NL in the 1995 regular season (having posted a very solid 90–54 record). The Cleveland Indians, on the other hand, newcomers to the post-season (having not been in the post-season since 1954), in posting their 100–44 regular season mark, were the team which had posted not only the best regular season record in the AL, but had completed one of the best regular seasons in all of Major League Baseball history.  Further, though the Braves' line-up was not very threatening in 1995 (their .250 team batting average was the second lowest in the NL), still, the Braves could be confident with their star-studded pitching staff—especially their starting staff—headed by the likes of Greg Maddux, Tom Glavine, John Smoltz, and Steve Avery. On the other hand, though the Indians could not boast of having as nearly a strong starting rotation as the Braves, nevertheless, they could lay claim to a very solid bullpen and one of the greatest batting line-ups that baseball has ever seen.

It might also be noted that, though this was the first time that a team from Cleveland and one from Atlanta faced each other in the World Series, there were years, prior to the Braves being in Atlanta, in which the Braves faced a Cleveland team for baseball's crown. In 1948, the Boston Braves faced the Cleveland Indians (with the Indians winning that Series in 6 games). Even before that, in 1892, the Boston Beaneaters, a forerunner of the Braves, were also National League Champions in 1892, and faced the Cleveland Spiders for the championship.  The Beaneaters beat the Spiders that year to win that baseball championship.

The 1995 World Series was also noted for large-scale protests by Native American activists in response to the controversy surrounding both clubs' usage of Native American-themed nicknames, logos and mascots. (Relatedly, the Indians changed their name to the Guardians before the 2022 season, while the Braves have no plans to do so as of 2021.)

Broadcasting
NBC was originally scheduled to televise the entire Series; however, due to the cancellation of the 1994 Series (which had been slated for ABC, who last televised a World Series in 1989), coverage ended up being split between the two networks. Game 5 would be the last Major League Baseball game to be telecast by ABC (had there been a Game 7, ABC would have televised it) for 25 years. The network was scheduled to televise up to four wild card games in the 2020 MLB Postseason.

This was the only World Series to be produced under The Baseball Network umbrella (a revenue sharing joint venture between Major League Baseball, ABC and NBC). In July 1995, both networks announced that they would be pulling out of what was supposed to be a six-year-long  venture. NBC would next cover the 1997 (NBC's first entirely since 1988) and 1999 World Series over the course of a five-year-long contract, in which Fox would cover the World Series in even numbered years (1996, 1998 and 2000).

Also during the World Series in 1995, NBC's Hannah Storm not only became the first woman to serve as solo pre-game host of a World Series (CBS' Andrea Joyce co-hosted with Pat O'Brien in 1993) but also became the first woman to preside over a World Series Trophy presentation. Storm was infamously the recipient of a profane outburst from Albert Belle in his team's dugout. Later, Belle was unrepentant: "The Indians wanted me to issue a statement of regret when the fine was announced, but I told them to take it out. I apologize for nothing." John Saunders served as pre-game host for ABC's coverage. Serving as field reporters for the series were Lesley Visser (ABC) and Jim Gray (NBC).

The six games averaged a national Nielsen rating of 19.5 and a share of 33. Through 2016, this remains the highest-rated World Series of the post-strike era.

On the radio side, CBS was the national broadcaster with Vin Scully and Jeff Torborg on the call. Locally, WKNR aired the series in Cleveland with Herb Score and Tom Hamilton announcing, while WSB broadcast the series in Atlanta with Skip Caray, Pete Van Wieren, Don Sutton, and Joe Simpson announcing.

Summary

Matchups

Game 1

Atlanta ace Greg Maddux pitched a two-hit complete game victory in his first World Series appearance (and just the 15th two-hitter in Series history).

The Indians scored in the first inning when Kenny Lofton reached on an error, stole second and third, and scored on an RBI groundout by Carlos Baerga. In the bottom of the second, Fred McGriff launched a tape measure home run on his first ever World Series pitch off Cleveland starter Orel Hershiser to even the score at 1–1. Both starters settled down until the seventh, when Hershiser and the Cleveland bullpen walked the first three Braves to open the inning. The Braves would take a 3–1 lead after Luis Polonia hit into a run-scoring force play and Rafael Belliard bunted a perfect suicide squeeze. Lofton scored the Indians another run in the ninth to cut the Braves lead to a single run, (both Cleveland runs resulted from errors and were thus, unearned) but Baerga lifted a pop fly that third baseman Chipper Jones grabbed near the visiting dugout to end the game.

Game 2

Atlanta No. 2 starter Tom Glavine got the win in Game 2, aided by a big sixth-inning home run by catcher Javy López, who also picked Manny Ramirez off first base at a crucial moment in the eighth inning to erase a potential game-tying baserunner. The Indians had taken an early 2–0 lead on an Eddie Murray two-run home run after Albert Belle got on base, but the Braves evened the score in the third with a sac fly by Chipper Jones and an RBI single by David Justice. Lopez launched his home run in the sixth inning from Cleveland starter Dennis Martínez. The Atlanta bullpen held off the Indians in the later innings despite allowing a run in the seventh, and Mark Wohlers earned the save, giving the Braves a 2–0 series lead.

Game 3

With the World Series moving to smaller, raucous Jacobs Field in Cleveland, the Indians got their first win. The Indians offense got back on track off Atlanta starter John Smoltz. With the Tribe already down 1–0 in the bottom of the first, Kenny Lofton singled to center and scored on Omar Vizquel's triple into the right field corner. Omar then scored the go-ahead run when Carlos Baerga grounded out. In the third, the Tribe were back at it again when Lofton opened the inning by ripping a double into the right-center field gap. Omar then got a bunt single and Baerga singled to left to drive in Lofton. Albert Belle then rolled a grounder up the middle to score Vizquel to make it 4–1. This was Smoltz's only early exit and only poor start in eight career World Series appearances. The Braves got a boost, however, when reliever Brad Clontz induced a double play groundout by Manny Ramírez to escape further damage. Home runs by Fred McGriff and Ryan Klesko brought the Braves closer at 4–3. Cleveland added a run in the seventh on another RBI hit by Baerga scoring Lofton (who would reach base in all six of his plate appearances). With a 5–3 lead going into the eighth, trouble brewed for Cleveland when Charles Nagy and the bullpen gave up the lead. Marquis Grissom led off with a double off the wall. Polonia singled through the right side to drive in Grissom, sending Nagy to the showers. Chipper Jones walked, McGriff hit a deep fly moving the runners up a base, and David Justice reached when Baerga booted his groundball, subsequently allowing Polonia to score the tying run. The inning was capped off by Mike Devereaux's RBI single giving the Braves a 6–5 lead. The Braves couldn't hold on to their slim lead either as Sandy Alomar Jr. laced a game-tying double inside the line at first in the bottom of the eighth. The two closers, Mark Wohlers and José Mesa then matched zeros for the next two innings. In the 11th, the Braves went to Alejandro Peña. Baerga immediately smashed a double and after an intentional walk to Belle, veteran Eddie Murray singled to center, scoring pinch runner Álvaro Espinoza and cutting Atlanta's World Series lead in half.

A record 18 pitchers were used between the Braves and Indians in Games 2 and 3.

Game 4 

Braves manager Bobby Cox controversially decided to start left-handed pitcher Steve Avery in the critical Game 4 instead of coming back with Greg Maddux. Despite Avery's uncharacteristically poor regular season showing (7-13, 4.67 ERA), Cox felt he deserved a chance after having won the NLCS clincher against Cincinnati throwing six shutout innings. Young Braves outfielder Ryan Klesko hit a sixth-inning home run to give Atlanta the lead. This would be the last time a player would hit home runs in back-to-back World Series games until 2016. Avery again delivered six effective innings, only giving up a sixth-inning home run to Cleveland slugger Albert Belle. A controversial play happened when Eddie Murray hit a pitch over third base; left-field umpire Jim McKean called it foul while third-base umpire Harry Wendelstedt looked at Jim McKean to make the call.  Murray eventually walked and reached second on a balk by Avery, but Herbert Perry struck out to end the inning. The Braves promptly broke the tie with a three-run seventh, with David Justice batting in two of the runs with a single. An RBI double by Javy López gave the Braves an insurance run, making it 5–1. Reliever Pedro Borbón Jr. saved the 5–2 win after Mark Wohlers ran into trouble, and the Braves were one victory away from a title.

Game 5

It seemed the perfect situation for Atlanta with Greg Maddux pitching Game 5 with a chance to clinch the title, but Albert Belle slugged a two-run homer in the first inning, and the Braves lineup was held in check by Cleveland veteran Orel Hershiser who went eight innings, only surrendering two runs. Luis Polonia hit a solo home run into the fourth and Atlanta actually tied the game at 2–2 with a run-scoring infield single by Marquis Grissom in the fifth, but Cleveland got two more runs from Maddux making it 4–2. Jim Thome hit an insurance home run in the eighth, which proved necessary as Ryan Klesko homered in his third consecutive game, reducing the gap to 5–4. Klesko became the first person ever to homer in three consecutive World Series road games, by belting homers in Games 3, 4, and 5. The win gave Cleveland the hope of perhaps another Braves World Series collapse and sent the Series back to Atlanta.

As previously mentioned, this game was the most recent baseball game that ABC televised until the 2020 postseason.

Game 6

Controversy struck on the morning of Game 6 when Atlanta newspapers printed stories that right fielder David Justice had ripped the city's fans for not matching their motivation of past seasons. Justice, who had been struggling in the postseason, was vilified before the game, but when his sixth-inning home run off a 1–1 pitch by Jim Poole broke a scoreless tie, he became a hero. Tom Glavine pitched eight innings of one-hit ball and allowed just three walks (two to Albert Belle, who was caught stealing second in the second inning to keep a runner from advancing into scoring position) to help earn him the Series MVP. Only one Indian advanced into scoring position in the entire game when Kenny Lofton stole second, but no one could get him in. Cleveland starter Dennis Martínez lasted just 4 innings due to allowing four hits and five walks, but no Braves scored. After Justice's home run, the Braves managed just one hit. The lone hit for the Indians was a bloop-single by catcher Tony Peña in the sixth. Closer Mark Wohlers pitched the ninth inning, preserving the 1–0 shutout and Atlanta's coveted title when Carlos Baerga's fly ball landed in center fielder Marquis Grissom's glove. Carlos Baerga was responsible for making the last out in three of the four Cleveland losses; Games 1, 2 and 6. To date, this is the last 1–0 World Series game won by the home team.

In 1995, the Cleveland Indians batted .291 as a team, led the league in runs scored, hits, and stolen bases, and had eight .300 hitters in their starting lineup. However, the Tribe was held to a .179 batting average in the World Series.

Then-Executive Committee Chairman Bud Selig presided over the Commissioner's Trophy presentation for the first time. In the previous two World Series (1992 and 1993), American League president Dr. Bobby Brown presided over the trophy presentation. Selig would become Commissioner of Baseball in 1998.

Composite line score

1995 World Series (4–2): Atlanta Braves (N.L.) over Cleveland Indians (A.L.)

Aftermath
The 1995 Braves were in the midst of a streak of 14 consecutive division titles from 1991 through 2005 (excluding the 1994 season, which ended abruptly due to a players strike), however this was the only World Series the Braves would win. Atlanta returned to the Series the following year, but lost to the New York Yankees in six games. This was Atlanta's first championship in any of the four major professional sports, and the last for the city and for the Braves until 2021.

The core of the 1990s Indians teams would break up in the early 2000s, most notably with Manny Ramirez joining the Boston Red Sox in 2001 and Jim Thome joining the Philadelphia Phillies in 2003. The 1995 and 1997 Indians failed to end the Cleveland sports curse, which stood at 31 and 33 years, respectively, since the 1964 Cleveland Browns won the city's most recent championship. The Curse would eventually end in 2016, when the Cleveland Cavaliers won the NBA Title, giving the city its first major sports title in 52 years.

See also
1995 Japan Series

Notes

External links

 1995 Atlanta Braves
 1995 Cleveland Indians
 Brave Hearts 
 Tavarez relishes postseason

World Series
World Series
Atlanta Braves postseason
Cleveland Indians postseason
World Series
World Series
1995 in Atlanta
1990s in Cleveland
October 1995 sports events in the United States
Baseball competitions in Cleveland
Baseball competitions in Atlanta